"A Little Less Sixteen Candles, a Little More 'Touch Me'", is a song by American rock band Fall Out Boy and the third and last single taken from their second studio album, From Under the Cork Tree (2005). "A Little Less Sixteen Candles, a Little More 'Touch Me'" was released to radio on March 14, 2006. Released in 2006, though the song never reached the popularity that previous singles "Sugar, We're Goin Down" and "Dance, Dance" achieved, it received moderate playtime on both pop radio and alternative rock radio stations and peaked at No. 65 on the US Billboard Hot 100. The video also reached No. 1 on TRL on both May 5 and May 8, 2006, being the third consecutive single from the album to reach the top position.

The song was originally titled "A Little Less Molly Ringwald, a Little More Samantha Fox". Molly Ringwald is an actress who starred in the 1984 movie Sixteen Candles, referenced in the final song title. "Touch Me" is a reference to the hit song by Samantha Fox. The accompanying music video to "A Little Less Sixteen Candles, a Little More 'Touch Me'" was nominated for Best Video Inspired by a Film at the First Annual Fuse Fangoria Chainsaw Awards 2006.

Music video
The extended music video, directed by Alan Ferguson, features the band members acting as a team of vampire hunters trying to fend off a gang of vampires attacking their town. It ends with a climactic showdown between the band and the vampires, resulting in Wentz being arrested and his subsequent realization that all the police officers are also vampires. Many of its scenes are parodies from various horror films; for example, the opening scene is a take-off from the film The Lost Boys and the video's style is similar to that of the Blade films. Drummer Andy Hurley can be seen wearing a Guns N' Roses T-shirt.

The video features cameos from members of several Fueled by Ramen/Decaydance bands and people associated with Fall Out Boy, including;
 William Beckett of The Academy Is... as the leader of the Dandies. He is the one who changed Pete, according to flashbacks in the video.
 Michael Carden of The Academy Is... as one of the Dandies. He is seen helping another vampire toss someone against a car.
 Brendon Urie of Panic! at the Disco as one of the Dandies. He is seen mainly using powers of mesmerize to hypnotize young women into making them dance with him before changing them.
 Spencer Smith of Panic! at the Disco as one of the Dandies. He is also seen using powers of mesmerize to hypnotize young women into making them dance with him before changing them.
 Travie McCoy, a.k.a. Schleprok of Gym Class Heroes, as one of the Vampires from the Hood. He is seen giving the Clandestine gang sign (appropriately shaped like a bat) and egging on a fight between another Vampire from the Hood and a punk vampire.
 Charlie a.k.a. WarChief, Fall Out Boy's security manager, appears in the video as a priest.
 Dirty, Fall Out Boy's special effects/lighting guy, shows up in the video gathering information for Patrick. He is attacked and killed by one of the punk vampires.

Track listing
Lyrics written by bassist/backing vocalist Pete Wentz, music composed by Fall Out Boy, excluding covers.

CD one
 "A Little Less Sixteen Candles, a Little More "Touch Me"" – 2:49
 "So Sick" (Ne-Yo cover at BBC Radio 1 Live Lounge)
CD two
 "A Little Less Sixteen Candles, a Little More "Touch Me"" – 2:49
 "Roxanne" (The Police cover) – 3:12
 "Our Lawyer Made Us Change the Name of This Song So We Wouldn't Get Sued" (Sessions@AOL) – 3:08
7"
 "A Little Less Sixteen Candles, a Little More "Touch Me"" – 2:49
 "Of All the Gin Joints in All the World" (Zane Lowe Session) – 3:11

Charts

References

External links

2006 singles
Fall Out Boy songs
Songs about vampires
Songs written by Pete Wentz
Songs written by Patrick Stump
2005 songs
Island Records singles
Song recordings produced by Neal Avron
Music videos directed by Alan Ferguson (director)